The Lycoming TIO-541 engine is a turbocharged, fuel-injected, horizontally opposed, six-cylinder aircraft engine featuring three cylinders per side, manufactured by Lycoming Engines.

The TIO-541 family of engines includes the TIGO-541 turbocharged, fuel-injected, geared, horizontally opposed engine.

There is no carburetted, non-turbocharged version of the engine, which would have been designated O-541 and therefore the base model is the TIO-541.

Design and development
The engine has a fuel injection system which meters fuel in proportion to the induction airflow. The cylinders have air-cooled heads.

The first TIO-541-A1A was type certified on 23 February 1965 on the regulatory basis of CAR 13 effective 15 June 1956 as amended to 13-1 through 13-4.

Variants
TIO-541-A1A
Six-cylinder, turbocharged, fuel-injected,  engine, dry weight , AiResearch T-1823 turbosupercharger, certified 23 February 1965. Has top induction, down exhaust and side-mounted accessory drives. Provisions for a single-acting, controllable-pitch propeller and internal piston cooling oil jets.
TIO-541-E1A4
Six-cylinder, turbocharged, fuel-injected,  engine, dry weight , AiResearch T-1823 turbosupercharger, certified 16 December 1966. Similar to the -A1A but with higher horsepower rating, different cylinder heads, cam shaft, crankshaft and extra counterweights. Incorporates cabin pressurization venturi.
TIO-541-E1B4
Six-cylinder, turbocharged, fuel-injected,  engine, dry weight , AiResearch T-1823 turbosupercharger, certified 16 December 1966. Similar to the -E1A4 but without the cabin pressurization venturi.
TIO-541-E1C4
Six-cylinder, turbocharged, fuel-injected,  engine, dry weight , AiResearch T-1879 turbosupercharger, certified 21 October 1969. Similar to the -E1A4 but with a different turbosupercharger with cast bracket, cast transition and a separate wastegate.
TIO-541-E1D4
Six-cylinder, turbocharged, fuel-injected,  engine, dry weight , AiResearch T-1879 turbosupercharger, certified 21 October 1969. Similar to the -E1B4 but with a different turbosupercharger with cast bracket, cast transition and a separate wastegate.
TIGO-541-B1A
Six-cylinder, turbocharged, fuel-injected, geared,  engine, dry weight , AiResearch T-1879 turbosupercharger, certified 12 February 1970. Similar to the -C1A but with a higher power rating and without provisions for cabin bleed air.
TIGO-541-C1A
Six-cylinder, turbocharged, fuel-injected, geared,  engine, dry weight , AiResearch T-1879 turbosupercharger, certified 19 November 1968. Has internal piston cooling oil jets, side-mounted accessory drives and a single oil supply from the propeller governor. Provisions for a reverse-pitch propeller control.
TIGO-541-D1A
Six-cylinder, turbocharged, fuel-injected, geared,  engine, dry weight , AiResearch T-18A21 turbosupercharger, certified 26 June 1969. Similar to the -C1A but with a higher power rating and a different turbocharger with provisions for cabin bleed air.
TIGO-541-D1B
Six-cylinder, turbocharged, fuel-injected, geared,  engine, dry weight , AiResearch T-18A51 turbosupercharger, certified 3 December 1976. Similar to the -D1A but with an integral wastegate turbocharger and a revised exhaust system and with low drag cylinders.
TIGO-541-E1A
Six-cylinder, turbocharged, fuel-injected, geared,  engine, dry weight , AiResearch T-18A21 turbosupercharger, certified 26 June 1969. Similar to the -D1A but with a lower power rating, different turbocharger spring rate and a variable absolute pressure controller.
TIGO-541-G1AD
Six-cylinder, turbocharged, fuel-injected, geared,  engine, dry weight , AiResearch T-18A21 turbosupercharger, certified 1 May 1975. Similar to the -D1A but it includes an intercooler, a dual magneto and a fuel injector with fuel head enrichment.

Applications
TIO-541
Beechcraft Baron
Beechcraft Duke
Mooney Mustang
Moynet 360-6 Jupiter

TIGO-541
Piper PA-31P-425 Navajo
Norman Dube Aerocruiser 450 Turbo

Specifications (TIO-541-A1A)

See also
List of aircraft engines

References

TIO-541
1960s aircraft piston engines